Iocenes is a genus of flowering plants in the daisy family.

There is only one known species, Iocenes acanthifolius, native to extreme southern South America (Tierra del Fuego Province in Argentina and Magallanes Region in Chile).

References

Senecioneae
Monotypic Asteraceae genera
Flora of South America